Tennessee Creek is a stream in Lake County, Colorado. It rises on the south side of Tennessee Pass near the Eagle County-Lake County line.

The creek joins with the East Fork Arkansas River northwest of Leadville to form the Arkansas River. At the confluence of Tennessee Creek and East Fork Arkansas River, the river that bears only the name "Arkansas River" begins.

See also
List of rivers of Colorado
List of tributaries of the Colorado River

References

Rivers of Colorado
Rivers of Lake County, Colorado
Tributaries of the Arkansas River